An anastigmat or anastigmatic lens is a photographic lens completely corrected for the three main optical aberrations: spherical aberration, coma, and astigmatism. Early lenses often included the word Anastigmat in their name to advertise this new feature (Doppel-Anastigmat, Voigtländer Anastigmat Skopar, etc.). The first Anastigmat was designed by Paul Rudolph for the German firm Carl Zeiss AG in 1890.

All modern photographic lenses are close to being anastigmatic, meaning that they can create extremely sharp images for all objects across their field of view; the underlying limitation is that the lens can deliver the anastigmatic performance only up to a maximum aperture (i.e., it has a minimum F-number) and only within a given working distance (focusing range). Note that all optical aberrations (except spherical aberration) become more pronounced towards the edges of the field of view, even with high-grade anastigmatic lenses.

Anastigmatic performance is accomplished by a proper combination of multiple lenses (optical surfaces), usually three or more. Aspheric lenses can minimize the number of surfaces required and thus the bulk and weight of the composite lens; however, aspheric surfaces are more costly to manufacture than spherical and other conic section (hyperbolic, parabolic) ones. Many high-end catoptric telescopes are three-mirror anastigmat, while the corresponding catadioptric telescopes use two mirrors (reflector) and one lens (refractor) to accomplish the same result.

See also
Stigmator, for the astigmatism correction of electron beams

Photographic lens designs